Sofia Marianne Ledarp (born 8 April 1974) is a Swedish actress. Born in the Stockholm suburb Hägersten, she studied at Luleå Theatre Academy 1996–2000. In January 2008, she received the Guldsolen and Guldbagge Awards for her role as Lena in the 2007 film Den man älskar.
She is best known internationally for her role as Malin Erikson in the Millennium movies.

Selected filmography
2004 - Om Stig Petrés hemlighet (TV)
2005 - Medicinmannen (TV)
2006 - Varannan vecka
2008 - Häxdansen (TV)
2008 - Oskyldigt dömd (TV)
2008 - Vi hade i alla fall tur med vädret – igen
2009 - The Girl with the Dragon Tattoo
2009 - Guds tre flickor
2009 - The Girl Who Played with Fire
2009 - The Girl Who Kicked the Hornets' Nest
2011 - Försvunnen
2012 - Hinsehäxan (TV)
2012 - Cockpit
2013 - Fröken Frimans krig (TV)
2014 - Blå Ögon (TV)
2015 - Glada hälsningar från Missångerträsk
2015 - Fröken Frimans krig (TV)

References

External links

Swedish Film Database

Living people
Swedish actresses
1974 births
Actresses from Stockholm
Best Actress Guldbagge Award winners